The individual dressage in equestrian at the 1972 Olympic Games in Munich was held at Dressage Facility Nymphenburg with the Grand-Prix on 7 September and the ride-off on 9 September.

Competition format
The individual medals were only awarded based on the results of the ride-off, with the Grand Prix serving as a qualifying round for the ride-off. The top twelve in the Grand Prix qualified for the ride-off only the top 12 qualifiers were eligible to medal.  This was a first for this event as in years past the combined Grand Prix and ride-off score would determine the medalists.

Results

References

External links
Official report

Equestrian at the 1972 Summer Olympics